Gurion is a given name and surname. It may refer to:

Ben Gurion (disambiguation)
 (born 1935), Israeli musician, member of the Dudaim duo
Gurion Hyman (1925–2017),  Canadian anthropologist, linguist, pharmacist, composer, artist and translator

See also
Gorion, name variant
Gourion